Joker Out are a Slovenian indie rock band. The band is set to represent Slovenia in the Eurovision Song Contest 2023 with the song "Carpe Diem". They were formed in 2016 and have released two albums.

Career

2016–2021: Formation and Umazane misli 
The group was formed in May 2016 after the breakup of Apokalipsa, which included Bojan Cvjetićanin, Martin Jurkovič, Matic Kovačič and Luka Škerlep. Three of them (Cvjetićanin, Jurkovič, and Kovačič) were joined by Kris Guštin and Jan Peteh from Buržuazija, and Joker Out was born. In November they released their first single "Kot srce, ki kri poganja", for which they also recorded their first music video. On June 17, 2017, they became the winners of the 4th season (2016/17) of the Špil league (a competition for student musical groups and soloists). In November they released their second song "Omamljeno telo". The group also performed at many festivals.

Their next single "Gola", on which they first collaborated with producer Jaret Pak, was released on September 12, 2019. On November 2, they had their first completely independent concert, held at the Ljubljana Castle. "Gola" was followed by the fourth single "Vem, da greš" in March 2020, followed by "Umazane misli" (October 2020) and "A sem ti povedal" (July 2021). Jure Maček replaced drummer Matic Kovačič between the releases of "Umazane misli" and "A sem ti povedal". The composition "Umazane misli" was chosen by the audience as the "New Slovenian composition of the last year" at the first edition of the festival Frišno/Fresh - The Day of New Slovenian Music, which took place on October 1, 2021.

Their first album Umazane misli was released in October 2021. It was originally supposed to be released in April 2020, but the release was postponed several times due to the COVID-19 pandemic. It was presented at two consecutive concerts on October 20 and 21, 2021 in Cvetličarna, both of which were sold out in 2020. The second concert was recorded by RTV Slovenia. In these two years, they received two Zlata piščal awards: in 2020 for "Newcomers of the Year", and in 2021 for "Artists of the Year".

2022–present: Demoni and Eurovision Song Contest 
In April 2022, they released the music video for the last single from their first album "Barve Oceana". On May 12, at the eighth edition of the Zlata piščal Awards, they were nominated for "Artist of the Year" for the second year in a row. On August 31, they released their second album Demoni, which was preceded by the song "Katrina". They held a presentation concert for the album on September 9 in Ljubljana's Križanke. On October 10, they announced on Instagram that bassist Martin Jurkovič was leaving the band to study abroad and was being replaced by Nace Jordan, a member of "Diamanti", the house band of the "V petek zvečer" show. "Katrina" was followed at the end of October by "Demons", their first Serbian-language single, which represents their first official release for the former Yugoslav market.

On 8 December 2022, RTV Slovenia announced that Joker Out will represent Slovenia in the Eurovision Song Contest 2023 in Liverpool. Recording for their Eurovision song took place within the month of December 2022 in a Hamburg, Germany studio over a 12-day period. The band stated that they wanted to keep the entire song in the Slovene language, saying: "we want to translate Slovenian into a universal language of dance and entertainment that all countries understand." In January 2023, the band shot their music video in Slovenia's capital Ljubljana, at the Grand Hotel Union.

On 31 January, Joker Out was drawn to perform in the second half of the second semi-final on 11 May.

Band members

Current members
 Bojan Cvjetićanin – lead vocals 
 Kris Guštin – guitar, backing vocals 
 Jan Peteh – guitar, backing vocals 
 Jure Maček – drums 
 Nace Jordan – bass, backing vocals

Former members
 Martin Jurkovič – bass 
 Matic Kovačič – drums

Timeline

Discography

Albums

Singles

Awards and nominations

References

Eurovision Song Contest entrants of 2023
Eurovision Song Contest entrants for Slovenia
Slovenian alternative rock groups
Slovenian rock music groups
Musical groups established in 2016
2016 establishments in Slovenia